The Diocese of Richmond is a Latin Church ecclesiastical jurisdiction or diocese of the Catholic Church in the United States. Its current territory encompasses all of central and southern Virginia, the Hampton Roads area, and the Eastern Shore of Chesapeake Bay.  It is a suffragan diocese of the metropolitan Archdiocese of Baltimore, from which its territory was taken, and is a constituent of the ecclesiastical province of Baltimore.

As of 2018, the diocese contained 241,276 Catholics and 142 parishes. The diocese currently has 91 active priests, 41 retired priests, 140 permanent deacons, seven religious brothers, 181 religious sisters of Catholic religious orders and 31 seminarians serving 139 parishes. There are 28 diocesan Catholic schools in the diocese, with a total enrollment of 8,827 students in 5 high schools and 22 elementary schools.

The diocese's current bishop is Barry C. Knestout, who was appointed by Pope Francis on December 5, 2017. He was installed to the position on January 12, 2018.

History

1600 to 1800

Prior to the American Revolution, few Catholics lived in the British Colony of Virginia. Attempts to found Catholic settlements in Virginia were made by Lord Baltimore in 1629, and by Captain George Brent in 1687. In 1634, Father John Altham, a Jesuit companion of Father Andrew White, performed missionary work among the Native American tribes living on the south bank of the Potomac River. 

The colonial government of Virginia soon enacted stringent laws against the practice of Catholicism. In 1687, Fathers Edmonds and Raymond were arrested at Norfolk, Virginia, for exercising their priestly functions. During the last quarter of the 17th century, the few Catholic settlers at Aquia Creek near the Potomac, were attended by then Father John Carroll and other Jesuit missionaries from Maryland.

1800 to 1820 
With the 1786 passage of Virginia Statute for Religious Freedom, proposed by future US President Thomas Jefferson, Catholics were granted religious freedom in the new state of Virginia. Reverend Jean Dubois, accompanied by several French priests and letters of introduction from the Marquis de Lafayette, arrived in Norfolk in August 1791. At the end of that year, the Virginia General Assembly invited Dubois to celebrate a mass in the courtroom of the new Virginia State House.  This was the first mass conducted anywhere in Richmond.Future US President James Monroe hosted Dubois in Richmond until he was able to rent a house there. Dubois later opened a school to teach French, the classics and arithmetic.Virginia Governor Patrick Henry helped Dubois learn English. For two years, Dubois mainly celebrated mass in rented rooms or at the homes of Richmond's few Catholic families.

According to tradition, Alexandria, Virginia, had a log chapel with an unknown resident Catholic priest by 1776.  Reverend John Thayer from Boston was stationed at the chapel in 1794. The Reverend Francis Neale erected a brick church in Alexandria in 1796 and constructed a larger one there in 1811.  Fathers Anthony Kohlmann and future Bishop Bitenedict Fenwick frequently officiated in Alexandria. 

Around 1796, the Reverend James Bushe started building a church in Norfolk. He was succeeded there by the future Archbishop Leonard Neale.

1820 to 1850
Pope Pius VII erected the Diocese of Richmond on July 11, 1820.  He removed all of Virginia (except for the two counties of the Eastern Shore region) from the Archdiocese of Baltimore. Pius VII designated the new diocese as a suffragan of the Archdiocese of Baltimore and appointed Reverend Patrick Kelly as its first bishop.

After arriving in New York in 1820, Kelly traveled to Baltimore to meet Bishop Ambrose Maréchal. Kelly wrote about to his brother about Maréchal :He did not receive me over kindly, and tried to persuade me it would be dangerous to take possession of my See; but his arguments did not satisfy me, and I arrived Norfolk on 19th January.In January 1821, Kelly took up residence in Norfolk, Virginia, which had a larger Catholic population than the episcopal see in Richmond. While bishop, Kelly opened the first Catholic school in the diocese and engaged in missionary efforts. Kelly was soon involved in disputes with Maréchal over their jurisdictions. To end the fighting, Pius VII appointed Kelly as bishop of the Diocese of Waterford and Lismore in Ireland in early 1822.  There would be no new bishop in Richmond for the next 18 years.

Pope Gregory XVI named Reverend Richard Whelan as the new bishop of the Diocese of Richmond in 1840. Since Kelly's departure, in 1822, the Diocese of Richmond had been vacant. During that period, Richmond had become a stronghold of the Know-Nothing political party, known for its anti-Catholic bigotry and violence.  As the diocese only had six priests, Whelan appealed to the Societies for the Propagation of the Faith in Paris, Lyon, France, and Vienna in the Austrian Empire to recruit priests. He also established a seminary college outside Richmond, where he resided and taught classes whenever he was in town. Whelan also established several parishes, missions and schools. 

In 1848, Whelan petitioned Pope Pius IX to divide the Diocese of Richmond into two dioceses, with the Allegheny Mountains serving as the boundary. On July 19, 1850, Pope Pius IX erected the Diocese of Wheeling.  He removed from the Diocese of Richmond all of Virginia west of the Allegheny Mountains and the state of Pennsylvania.  Pius IX named Whelan bishop of the new diocese and replaced him in Richmond with Reverend John McGill of the Diocese of Bardstown.

1850 to 1870 
When McGill arrived in Richmond in December 1850, the diocese had 7,000 Catholics, eight priests, and 10 churches. He convened the first diocesan synod in 1855. During his tenure, Virginia was devastated by yellow fever and cholera epidemics. Pius IX on August 15, 1858, transferred the territory of Alexandria to the Diocese of Richmond. The Federal government in 1846 had retroceded the city of Alexandria back to Virginia from the District of Columbia.

During the American Civil War, Catholics in the Confederate States were unable to purchase Catholic books published in the North. To fill the gap, McGill wrote, "The True Church Indicated to the Inquirer" and "Our Faith, the Victory", republished as "The Creed of Catholics". He also visited Union Army prisoners of war in the Libby Prison in Richmond, doing what he could to aid them.  In 1867, McGill brought the Sisters of Charity from Emmitburgh, Maryland, to set up a school in the diocese. McGill died in 1872 and Piux IX named James Gibbons, then vicar apostolic of North Carolina, as the new bishop of Richmond. Gibbons stayed in Richmond for five years, at which point Pius IX appointed him coadjutor archbishop of Baltimore.

The start of the Civil War led to the formation of the state of West Virginia. It consisted of the western counties of Virginia, which had seceded from Virginia rather than be part of the breakaway Confederate States of America However, the new state boundary between Virginia and West Virginia did not coincide with the boundary between the Dioceses of Wheeling and Richmond.  This disparity endured for over a century. Pope Pius IX erected the new Diocese of Wilimington on March 3, 1868.  As part of that new diocese, the pope removed two Eastern Shore counties from the Diocese of Richmond.

1870 to 1910 
After McGill died in 1872, Pope Leo XIII appointed John J. Keane of the Archdiocese of Baltimore as the new bishop of Richmond. As bishop, Keane established the Confraternity of the Holy Ghost, a Catholic fellowship, in the diocese. He published A Sodality Manual for the Use of the Servants of the Holy Ghost in 1880. Despite opposition, Keane founded schools and churches for Catholic African-Americans in the diocese. He addressed Protestant groups to educate them about the Catholic Church.  Keene was appointed rector of the Catholic University of America in Washington D.C. in 1886.  He resigned his post as bishop two years later to serve full time as rector.

In 1889, Leo XIII appointed Reverend Augustine Van de Vyver as bishop of the Diocese of Richmond. In 1901, philanthropist Thomas Ryan and his wife donated almost $500,000 to buy the land and construct a new Sacred Heart Cathedral in Richmond. It was consecrated on November 29, 1906. While bishop, Van de Vyver open new religious congregations, schools and other Catholic institutions. With assistance from a donor, Van de Vyver opened a industrial college for African-American boys in Rock Castle, Virginia.  Katherine Drexel, mother superior of the Sisters of the Blessed Sacrament. opened a school for African-American girls.

On August 22, 1902, Joseph Anciaux a Belgian Josephite priest in Virginia wrote a letter to the Congregation of the Propaganda in Rome, condemning acceptance by the U.S. Catholic hierarchy of racial segregation in the United States.  He called it a radical and non-Catholic policy, and accused Van de Vyver personally of timidity in the face of "negro haters".  On October 28, 1902, Van de Vyver forced Anciaux to leave the diocese.

1910 to 2000 
After Van de Vyver died in 1911, Pope Pius X named Auxiliary Bishop Denis J. O'Connell of the Archdiocese of San Francisco as the new bishop of Richmond.  He resigned due to bad health in 1926 and Pope Pius XI named Auxiliary Bishop Andrew Brennan of the Diocese of Scranton to replace him.  In 1929, at Brennan's suggestion, the Holy Name Society of Richmond establish the Catholic Laymen's League of Virginia.  It was created to counteract the flow of anti-Catholic bigotry and misinformation in the media and from some Protestant ministers.

In 1935, Pius XI named Reverend Peter Ireton of the Archdiocese of Baltimore to assist Brennan as coadjutor bishop of the Diocese of Richmond, a job Ireton would hold for ten years.When Brennan resigned in 1945, Ireton automatically succeeded him as bishop of Richmond.During his tenure as bishop, Ireton established 42 parishes, built 24 schools, and increased the Catholic population from 37,000 to 147,000.

Ireton died in 1958 and Pius XI appointed Bishop John Russell from the Diocese of Charleston as his replacement.In implementing the Second Vatican Council reforms, Russell established a diocesan Commission on Ecumenical Affairs in 1963, and a diocesan Pastoral Council and a Council of Priests in 1966. A champion of civil rights, he had the parents of prospective students for Richmond's Catholic schools be interviewed for signs of racism.

In 1970, Pope Paul VI named Reverend Walter Sullivan as auxiliary bishop in Richmond.  When Russell resigned in 1973, the pope appointed Sullivan as the new bishop. On May 28, 1974, Paul VI established the current boundaries of the Diocese of Richmond by:.
 Transferring the two Eastern Shore counties, ceded to the Diocese of Wilmington in 1868, back to the Diocese of Richmond
 Erecting the new Diocese of Arlington, taking Northern Virginia from the Diocese of Richmond  
 Realigning the boundary between the Dioceses of Richmond and Wheeling to match the Virginia-West Virginia state line  
In 1977, Sullivan established a joint Catholic and Episcopalian parish, Holy Apostles in Virginia Beach, Virginia.  The church had separate altars for the two denominations. That same year, he established the diocesan Commission on Sexual Minorities to reach out to LGBT Catholics.

2000 to present 
In 2003, after 33 years as bishop, Sullivan retired. Pope John Paul II named Bishop Francis X. DiLorenzo of the Diocese of Honolulu as his replacement in 2004. Upon his installation, DiLorenzo reactivated the diocese's liturgical commission to assert control over any statements or documents produced by clergy within the diocese. DiLorenzo forcibly retired Reverend Thomas J. Quinlan, pastor of Holy Family Catholic Church in Virginia Beach for a history of using offensive language during mass.  It culminated with what DiLorenzo termed a sacrilegious reference to Mary, mother of Jesus, at a Christmas Eve Mass. 

DiLorenzo moved his residence  from Cathedral Place in Richmond to Midlothian, Virginia. Some Catholics raised questions about the move and see it as a way to distance himself from his flock. But DiLorenzo responded that he is only 25 minutes away from the diocesan offices and that the move saved the diocese money: "Do I need to live in a three-story building by myself? I don't think so." The three-story house was turned into offices for those working in a building that the diocese was renting for $35,000 a year. "We saved ourselves thirty-some thousand a year," said DiLorenzo, "and I moved to Midlothian, a very quiet place."

In 2013, the diocese reported an increase in the number of seminarians preparing for the priesthood. According to Reverend Michael Boehling, the typical candidate was in his early to mid-20s, and was a college graduate with a degree in history, science or mathematics. "They are articulate and bright, well-rounded individuals who are mature for their age,"

DiLorenzo ended the diocesan sexual minorities commission, which his predecessor had established in 1977.DiLorenzo increased the number of clustered parishes. He also brought in consultants to review some diocesan departments and commissions that need to be abolished.DiLorenzo retired in 2017.  His replacement as bishop was Auxiliary Bishop Barry C. Knestout from the Archdiocese of Washington, appointed by Pope Francis in 2017

In early 2019, Knestout gave permission to the Episcopal Diocese of Southern Virginia to use Saint Bede Catholic Church in Williamsburg, Virginia, for the ordination of Susan B. Haynes as its new bishop. The Episcopal diocese does not have a cathedral and usually rotates where it hosts ordinations and other events. The announcement was met with opposition by Catholics who objected to holding a non-Catholic worship service and the episcopal ordination of a woman in a Catholic church. Over 3,000 people signed an online petition condemning the choice of venue. On January 17, 2010, the Episcopal diocese announced it would celebrate Haynes' ordination elsewhere.

Sexual abuse
On February 13, 2019, Knestout released a list of 42 priests with "credible and substantiated" accusations of sexual abuse against them. The list covers allegations from the 1950s to 1993.  The listed included Bishop Carroll Dozier of the Diocese of Memphis, who was accused of committing acts of sex abuse while serving in the Diocese of Richmond.

In 2019, Knestout instructed Reverend Mark White to shut down his blog, under pain of removal from the priesthood. White had criticized the church hierarchy's handling of the child sexual abuse crisis.  His targets included former Cardinal Theodore McCarrick, for whom Knestout had served as priest secretary, and Cadinal Donald Wuerl, with whom Knestout had worked as auxiliary bishop. In May 2020 Knestout removed White from his parish and trespassed him from the parish residence. Knestout ordered White to take up residence at a retreat center, and undertake a ministry to prisoners. On June 2, 2020, the Holy See denied White's appeal of Knestout's decree on technical grounds. In 2021, White said that Knestout was petitioning the Vatican to laicize him.

On October 15, 2020, Richmond newspapers revealed that the diocese had paid $6.3 million to settle 51 out of 68 claims of sexual abuse. In July 2121, the diocese added four more names to its list of clergy with credible accusations of sexual abuse.

Bishops

Bishops of Richmond
 Patrick Kelly (1820–1822), appointed Bishop of Waterford and Lismore
 Richard Vincent Whelan (1841–1850), appointed Bishop of Wheeling
 John McGill (1850–1872)
 James Gibbons (1872–1877), appointed Archbishop of Baltimore (elevated to Cardinal in 1886)
 John Joseph Keane (1878–1888), appointed Rector of The Catholic University of America and Archbishop of Dubuque
 Augustine Van de Vyver (1889–1911)
 Denis Joseph O'Connell (1912–1926)
 Andrew James Louis Brennan (1926–1945)
 Peter Leo Ireton (1945–1958)
 John Joyce Russell (1958–1973)
 Walter Francis Sullivan (1974–2003)
 Francis Xavier DiLorenzo (2004–2017)
 Barry Christopher Knestout (2018–present)

Auxiliary Bishops of Richmond
 Joseph Howard Hodges (1952–1961), appointed Bishop of Wheeling
 Ernest Leo Unterkoefler (1962–1964), appointed Bishop of Charleston
 James Louis Flaherty (1966–1975)
 Walter Francis Sullivan (1970–1974), appointed Bishop here
 David Edward Foley (1986–1994), appointed Bishop of Birmingham

Other priests of this diocese who became bishops
 Francis Janssens, appointed Bishop of Natchez in 1881 and later Archbishop of New Orleans
 Vincent Stanislaus Waters, appointed Bishop of Raleigh in 1945
 Carroll Thomas Dozier, appointed Bishop of Memphis in 1970
 Antons Justs (priest here, 1962–1974), appointed Bishop of Jelgava, Latvia in 1995

Notable people
Servant of God Francis J. Parater (1897–1920), seminarian and candidate for canonization

Knights of Columbus
The Knights of Columbus has several councils in the Richmond Diocese. The Knights serve parish and communities throughout both dioceses in the Commonwealth. One of the best known services is the KOVAR drive which raises money for assisting Virginians with intellectual disabilities.

High schools
 Benedictine College Preparatory, Richmond
 Blessed Sacrament Huguenot Catholic School, Powhatan
 Catholic High School, Virginia Beach
 Peninsula Catholic High School, Newport News
 Roanoke Catholic School, Roanoke
 Saint Gertrude High School, Richmond
 Walsingham Academy, Williamsburg

Closed schools
 Holy Cross Regional Catholic School, Lynchburg

See also

 Historical list of the Catholic bishops of the United States
 List of Catholic bishops of the United States
 List of the Catholic dioceses of the United States
 List of Roman Catholic archdioceses (by country and continent)
 List of Roman Catholic dioceses (alphabetical) (including archdioceses)
 List of Roman Catholic dioceses (structured view) (including archdioceses)

References

External links
Roman Catholic Diocese of Richmond Official Site
Cathedral of the Sacred Heart

 
Richmond
Richmond
Catholic Church in Virginia
Religious organizations established in 1820
Culture of Richmond, Virginia
Richmond
1820 establishments in Virginia